This is a partial chronological list of cases decided by the United States Supreme Court during the Taft Court, the tenure of Chief Justice William Howard Taft from July 11, 1921 through February 3, 1930.

References

Taft
List